Route 36 may refer to:

Route 36 (MTA Maryland), a public bus route in Baltimore, Maryland
London Buses route 36
SEPTA Route 36, a Philadelphia Subway-Surface Trolley line.
Route 36 (WMATA), a public bus route in Washington, D.C.
Harrogate bus route 36, a bus route in Yorkshire, England 
Route 36 (bar), a cocaine bar in La Paz, Bolivia

See also
List of highways numbered 36

36